Şehzade Mehmed (2 January 1717 – 2 January 1756) was the son of Ottoman Sultan Ahmed III (reign 1703–1730) and his consort Rukiye Kadın.

Early life
Şehzade Mehmed was born on 2 January 1717 to Ahmed III and his consort Rukiye Kadın. He had a full-sister named Hatice Sultan seven years older than him.

Following his birth, his half-brother Mustafa (later Mustafa III) was born and the birth of both princes were celebrated in February 1717. Large number of food and sweets, clothes were provided to the people on the birth of the two princes. In 1720, a large fifteen days circumcision ceremony took place for Mehmed, and his brothers, princes Süleyman, Mustafa, and Bayezid. After his circumcision he was educated and taught in the Topkapi Palace.
 
He was taught by his lala (teacher). He had mastered mathematics and geography. He spoke fluent Persian and English.

Life in the Kafes
After his father's deposition, he lived he lived mostly confined to Kafes. Mehmed went on campaigns along with his cousin Mahmud I. He met French ambassadors and also had good relations with the Admiral of the Fleet.

In 1743, he built a rest house in Manisa for travellers. He met grand vizier and Şeyḫülislām.

Death
Şehzade Mehmed died in the Kafes on 2 January 1756. He was buried inside the Mausoleum of Turhan Sultan in Istanbul, Turkey.

References

Sources
 

18th-century Ottoman royalty
1717 births
1756 deaths